The 1953–54 Minneapolis Lakers season was the sixth season for the franchise in the National Basketball Association (NBA). The Lakers won the Western Division with a 46–26 record. George Mikan was hampered by knee troubles as he averaged only 18.1 points per game. The Lakers signed a promising rookie named Clyde Lovellette, who was able to alleviate the pressure on Mikan.
In the first round of the playoffs, the Lakers won three straight to face the Rochester Royals in the Western Finals. The Lakers beat the Royals to qualify for the NBA Finals. In the Finals, the Lakers and Syracuse Nationals alternated wins. In the end, the Lakers emerged with their third straight title, and fifth overall in the franchise's first six seasons in the NBA. They became the first NBA team to win three consecutive NBA championships. In the seventh and final game, the Lakers won by a score of 87–80, for the franchise's final NBA title before their relocation to Los Angeles in 1960. Following the season, Mikan announced his retirement.

The Lakers would not win another NBA championship until 1972.

NBA Draft

Roster

Regular season

Season standings

Record vs. opponents

Game log

Playoffs

|- align="center" bgcolor="#ccffcc"
| 1
| March 17
| Rochester
| W 109–88
| Slater Martin (24)
| Minneapolis Auditorium
| 1–0
|- align="center" bgcolor="#ccffcc"
| 2
| March 18
| @ Fort Wayne
| W 90–85
| George Mikan (28)
| War Memorial Coliseum
| 2–0
|- align="center" bgcolor="#ccffcc"
| 3
| March 20
| Fort Wayne
| W 78–73
| George Mikan (21)
| Minneapolis Auditorium
| 3–0
|-

|- align="center" bgcolor="#ccffcc"
| 1
| March 24
| Rochester
| W 89–76
| George Mikan (28)
| Minneapolis Auditorium
| 1–0
|- align="center" bgcolor="#ffcccc"
| 2
| March 27
| @ Rochester
| L 73–74
| George Mikan (17)
| Edgerton Park Arena
| 1–1
|- align="center" bgcolor="#ccffcc"
| 3
| March 28
| Rochester
| W 82–72
| George Mikan (17)
| Minneapolis Auditorium
| 2–1
|-

|- align="center" bgcolor="#ccffcc"
| 1
| March 31
| Syracuse
| W 79–68
| Clyde Lovellette (16)
| George Mikan (10)
| Slater Martin (6)
| Minneapolis Auditorium4,579
| 1–0
|- align="center" bgcolor="#ffcccc"
| 2
| April 3
| Syracuse
| L 60–62
| George Mikan (15)
| George Mikan (15)
| Vern Mikkelsen (3)
| Minneapolis Auditorium6,277
| 1–1
|- align="center" bgcolor="#ccffcc"
| 3
| April 4
| @ Syracuse
| W 81–67
| George Mikan (30)
| George Mikan (15)
| Slater Martin (7)
| Onondaga War Memorial8,719
| 2–1
|- align="center" bgcolor="#ffcccc"
| 4
| April 8
| @ Syracuse
| L 69–80
| Whitey Skoog (16)
| Jim Pollard (9)
| Slater Martin (6)
| Onondaga War Memorial7,655
| 2–2
|- align="center" bgcolor="#ccffcc"
| 5
| April 10
| @ Syracuse
| W 84–73
| Vern Mikkelsen (21)
| Mikan, Lovellette (13)
| Slater Martin (7)
| Onondaga War Memorial7,283
| 3–2
|- align="center" bgcolor="#ffcccc"
| 6
| April 11
| Syracuse
| L 63–65
| George Mikan (30)
| —
| —
| Minneapolis Auditorium6,776
| 3–3
|- align="center" bgcolor="#ccffcc"
| 7
| April 12
| Syracuse
| W 87–80
| Jim Pollard (21)
| —
| —
| Minneapolis Auditorium7,274
| 4–3
|-

Awards and honors
 George Mikan, All-NBA First Team
 Jim Pollard, All-NBA Second Team
 George Mikan, NBA All-Star Game
 Jim Pollard, NBA All-Star Game
 Slater Martin, NBA All-Star Game

References

External links
 1953 Lakers on Database Basketball
 1953–54 Lakers on Basketball Reference

Los Angeles Lakers seasons
Minneapolis Lakers season
NBA championship seasons
Minnesota Lakers
Minnesota Lakers